The following is a list of awards and nominations received by William Shatner. Shatner earned Saturn Award nominations for his performances in the Star Trek films (as the awards did not reward television series at the time). He earned five Best Actor nominations: the first for Kingdom of the Spiders, the four other for the first four Star Trek films. He won the award for Star Trek II: The Wrath of Khan, and also earned The Life Career Award in 1980. On the negative side, Shatner was nominated for three Golden Raspberry Awards in Star Trek V: The Final Frontier, including Worst Screenplay and won two for Worst Actor & Worst Director.

In 2004, Shatner won his first Emmy Award for his role as Denny Crane on The Practice. In 2005, he won his first Golden Globe award and a second Emmy Award for Best Supporting Actor in a Drama Series for his work on Boston Legal.

In 2011, he was given made an honorary Doctor of Letters by McGill University, his alma mater.

In 2019, he was named an Officer of the Order of Canada.

Awards and nominations

See also

Notes

References

External links

Shatner, William
Awards and nominations